Bryan Enrique Abreu (born April 22, 1997) is a Dominican professional baseball pitcher for the Houston Astros of Major League Baseball (MLB). Abreu signed with the Astros as an international free agent in 2013, and made his major league debut in 2019.

Early life
Bryan Abreu was born in Santo Domingo in the Dominican Republic.  At age 13, he worked in construction and assisted an uncle, a mechanic, in repairing cars.  Tall and notably athletic, the first sport Abreu began playing was basketball, and when he was 14, began playing baseball.  It was at age 14 that his mother suggested that he choose a sport on which to focus, and Abreu chose baseball.

Career

2013-18
Abreu signed with the Houston Astros as an international free agent in November 2013. He made his professional debut in 2014 with the Dominican Summer League Astros, going 0–2 (win–loss record, W–L) with a 6.55 earned run average over 22 relief innings pitched.

Starting in 2014 and throughout his professional baseball career in the Houston Astros organization, Abreu has worked extensively with pitching coach Erick Abreu, who has also served in various levels within the Astros' minor league system.

Bryan Abreu returned to the Dominican Summer League Astros in 2015, earning a 2–2 record and a 3.83 earned run average over 14 games (ten starts).  In 2016, he began the year with the Greeneville Astros before being reassigned to the Gulf Coast League Astros.  Over  innings, he went 2–5 with a 4.89 earned run average.

In 2017, Abreu returned to Greeneville and compiled a 1–3 record with a 7.98 earned run average in eight games (six starts), and in 2018, he pitched for both the Tri-City ValleyCats and the Quad Cities River Bandits, going 6–1 with a 1.49 earned run average over 14 games (seven starts). The Astros added Abreu to their 40-man roster after the 2018 season.

2019–22
In 2019, he began the year with the Fayetteville Woodpeckers before being promoted to the Corpus Christi Hooks, with whom he was named a Texas League All-Star.

On July 31, 2019, the Astros promoted Abreu to the major leagues.  He made his major league debut that night, pitching a scoreless inning in relief. The following day, he was optioned back to Double-A Corpus Christi.  In 2020, Abreu struggled with accuracy, walking seven batters and hitting two in  innings before being optioned off the roster.

Abreu closed out the last three outs on July 23, 2022, in a 3–1 win versus the Seattle Mariners for his first save on the season.

He authored a breakout season in 2022, appearing in career-high 55 games, and produced a 1.94 earned run average, 4–0 won-loss record, two saves, 2.12 fielding independent pitching and 88 strikeouts, leading the Astros with 13.1 strikeouts per nine innings.

In a three-game sweep of the Mariners in the 2022 American League Division Series (ALDS), Abreu appeared in each game, delivering  shutout innings, allowing two total baserunners, and striking out six.  In Game 4 of the 2022 World Series, Abreu struck out the side in the seventh inning of a 5–0 combined no-hitter of the Philadelphia Phillies.  He relieved starting pitcher Cristian Javier, and Rafael Montero and Ryan Pressly followed Abreu.  It was the third no-hitter in major league postseason history, and the second in World Series play, following Don Larsen's perfect game in 1956.  The Astros defeated the Phillies in six games to give Abreu his first career World Series title.  Abreu pitched  shutout innings in the 2022 postseason, appearing in 10 of the Astros' 13 contests, and struck out 19 batters.

International career
Abreu made his World Baseball Classic (WBC) debut in 2023, pitching for the Dominican Republic.

See also

 List of Houston Astros no-hitters
 List of Major League Baseball no-hitters
 List of Major League Baseball players from the Dominican Republic

References
Footnotes

Sources

External links

1997 births
Living people
Sportspeople from Santo Domingo
Dominican Republic expatriate baseball players in the United States
Major League Baseball players from the Dominican Republic
Major League Baseball pitchers
Houston Astros players
Dominican Summer League Astros players
Gulf Coast Astros players
Greeneville Astros players
Tri-City ValleyCats players
Quad Cities River Bandits players
Fayetteville Woodpeckers players
Corpus Christi Hooks players
Sugar Land Skeeters players
2023 World Baseball Classic players